Cabinet of Jarosław Kaczyński was appointed on 14 July 2006 and passed the vote of confidence in Sejm on 19 July 2006.

The Cabinet

External links 
 http://www.polskieradio.pl/zagranica/gb/dokument.aspx?iid=56863

Kaczynski, Jaroslaw
History of Poland (1989–present)
Law and Justice
2006 establishments in Poland
2007 disestablishments in Poland
Cabinets established in 2006
Cabinets disestablished in 2007